Fota (statutory spelling Foaty) is an island in Cork Harbour, Ireland, just north of the larger island of Great Island.  Fota Island is host to Ireland's only wildlife park – as well as the historical Fota House and gardens and golf course owned by the "Fota Island Golf Club and Resort". The island comprises two townlands both called Foaty: one each in the civil parishes of Clonmel (the western half of Great Island) and Carrigtohill (on the mainland).

Name
Although Foaty is the spelling fixed in the nineteenth century by the Ordnance Survey of Ireland, Fota is now more common. The origin of the name is uncertain. It may be of Hiberno-Norse origin, with second element Old Norse  "island"; Donnchadh Ó Corráin suggests  "foot island", from its position at the mouth of the River Lee down from Cork city; some medieval references have an -r- in the name. Ó Corráin is sceptical of proposed Gaelic etymologies,  "sod house",   "warm sod", and  "decayed/withered".

Fota House and Gardens

Fota House

Fota House was the former home of the Smith-Barry family (Earls of Barrymore since 1627), descendants of Philip de Barry. The de Barry family came from Wales as part of the Norman invasion of Ireland. The family were granted lands at Fota and elsewhere in 1185. The family first resided at Barryscourt Castle, Carrigtwohill, then at Castlelyons where they held extensive lands. Fota House was originally a hunting lodge and became the family's main residence in the 1820s when the architect, Sir Richard Morrison (1767–1849) and his son Vetruvius Morrison (1794–1838), created the present regency mansion with over 70 rooms.

The last member of the Smith-Barry family to live in Fota House was Dorothy Bell (1894–1975), daughter of Arthur Smith-Barry, 1st Baron Barrymore (1843–1925). She continued to develop and record the plant collections in the gardens and in the arboretum, which her family had started in the 1840s. On Bell's death in 1975, the estate was sold to University College, Cork.

During the latter part of the last century, the house fell into some disrepair – culminating in the collapse of a ceiling. This closed the house to the public for some time. It was restored using EU, Irish government and private funding, prior to reopening in early 2002. In December 2007, the new Irish Heritage Trust took over responsibility for Fota House.

Fota Gardens

Fota Gardens are in the grounds of Fota House. These consist of a structured arboretum, walled garden and terraces. The gardens include rare and exotic shrubs and trees, along with an extensive rose garden.

The layout and structure of the arboretum and gardens date largely from the tenure of the Smith-Barry family, who recognised the significance of Fota's sheltered location and warm soil — "Fota" is derived from the Irish "Fód te" meaning warm soil. The conditions are appropriate for the growing and cultivation of certain trees and exotic plants.

The development of the arboretum and gardens coincided with the great plant hunting expeditions around the world bringing back specimens from places such as Asia, South America and the Pacific coast of northwest America. Some of these rare plants found their way to Fota within a few years of their discovery.

In the 1840s, John Smith-Barry ensured that trees were well-spaced - enabling them to thrive with displays of seasonal colour. The family also recorded the plant collections throughout the 19th and most of the 20th century and this work of cataloguing, conservation and development continues today.

Many of these plant collections are arranged in association with the National Botanic Gardens, Glasnevin, Dublin, and other botanic institutions such as the Royal Botanic Gardens Edinburgh, Scotland.

In 1996 the Irish state was given control of the arboretum and gardens. They are now administered by the Office of Public Works in conjunction with the Irish Heritage Trust.

Fota Island Resort
Fota Island Resort lies within a 780-acre estate (originally the Fota House demesne) comprising woodlands and landscaped areas. Its golf course consisted of three par 71 championship courses. These courses were named Deerpark (Par 71), Belvelly (Par 72) and Barryscourt (Par 73). Golf was first played in Fota Island in 1886. 

In 1993, Fota Island Golf Club was further developed by Christy O'Connor Junior (Irish Ryder Cup), and Peter McEvoy (two-time British Amateur Champion). The golf resort has hosted a number of tournaments, including the Irish Club Professional Championship, 2011 PGA Europro "Audi Cork Irish Masters", and the Irish Open in 2001, 2002 and 2014.

In 2004 the resort was purchased by the Killeen Group (owners of Mount Juliet Golf & Spa Hotel in Kilkenny), who invested to bring facilities in-line with European Tour standards. In November 2004, Killeen sold the club to the Fleming Group. In 2006, the Fleming Group completed construction of the 5-star Fota Island Hotel & Spa as well self-catering accommodation.

On 27 September 2013, Fota Island Resort management announced a handover to new owners, the Kang Family Worldwide Group. The Kang family, originally from Hebei Province in China, acquired the 500-acre resort from the National Asset Management Agency (NAMA).

Fota Wildlife Park

Opened in July 1983 by the President of Ireland, Dr Patrick Hillery, Fota Wildlife Park has the primary aim of conservation of global wildlife. It is a joint project of the Zoological Society of Ireland and University College, Cork.

Fota Wildlife Park has more than 70 species of exotic wildlife in open surroundings. Animals include ostriches, giraffes, kangaroos, zebras and antelope. Ring-tailed lemurs, wallabies and other animals freely roam the park.

Many of the animals at Fota are under threat of extinction, and Fota Wildlife Park is involved in breeding programs for these endangered species, as well as being a breeding source for other zoos around the world. An Asian sanctuary opened between in 2015, and includes enclosures for tigers and other animals. In 2017 the park was the eleventh most popular paid attraction in Ireland, with 455,559 visitors that year.

Transport
By rail, the island is served by Fota railway station, which opened on 1 July 1865.

By road, Fota lies just south of the N25 road from Cork to Rosslare. It is directly accessible via Cobh and Carrigtwohill on the R624 regional road - which runs from Tullagreen (N25 Southside Carrigtwohill-Cobh interchange) to Cobh town Center.

References

External links

Fota House and Gardens
Fota Island Resort
Fota Wildlife Park

Zoos in the Republic of Ireland
Islands of County Cork
Tourist attractions in County Cork
Parks in County Cork
Gardens in County Cork
Irish Open (golf) venues